Mistaya Mountain is located on the border of Alberta and British Columbia, on the Continental Divide. It was named in 1918. Mistaya is either the Cree name for "grizzly bear" or is the Stoney word for "much wind".

Mistaya is an easyish, non-technical mountain with good views, especially to the north, north-west and south.

Geology

Mistaya Mountain is composed of sedimentary rock laid down during the Precambrian to Jurassic periods. Formed in shallow seas, this sedimentary rock was pushed east and over the top of younger rock during the Laramide orogeny.

Climate

Based on the Köppen climate classification, Mistaya Mountain is located in a subarctic climate zone with cold, snowy winters, and mild summers.

Gallery

See also

 List of peaks on the British Columbia–Alberta border
 List of mountains in the Canadian Rockies

References

Three-thousanders of Alberta
Three-thousanders of British Columbia
Mountains of Banff National Park
Canadian Rockies